State of Reality is a 1984 Argentine historical drama film directed by Alejandro Doria and starring Luis Brandoni, Darío Grandinetti and Lito Cruz. The film won the 1985 Silver Condor Awards for Best Film, Best Director, Best Original Screenplay and Best Supporting Actress (China Zorrilla).

Cast
 Luis Brandoni as Carlos Ventura
 Dora Baret as Delia
 Luisina Brando as Susana
 Lito Cruz as Marcelo
 Oscar Ferrigno as El Profesor
 María Vaner as Nora
 China Zorrilla as Ágada
 Darío Grandinetti as Juan
 Fernando Álvarez 
 Clotilde Borella as pregnant mother
 Mónica Villa as Gladys
 Manuel Callau 
 Juan Carlos Corazza 
 Norberto Díaz 
 Gabriela Flores 
 Patricia Hart 
 Jean Pierre Noher as lab technician
 Ruben Cosenza 
 Jorge Marrale as Ferrero

Reception
The film won the 1985 Silver Condor Awards for Best Film, Best Director, Best Original Screenplay and Best Supporting Actress (China Zorrilla). It also won the award for best actress (still Zorrilla) at the 1984 Havana Film Festival, the Honourable Special Prize at the 1985 Golden Rose Film Festival, and the Feature Film Audience Award at the 1985 Biarritz Film Festival. It was screened out of competition at the 36th Berlin International Film Festival. 

The film is considered a metaphor of Argentine's return to democracy.

References

External links

1984 films
Argentine drama films
Films directed by Alejandro Doria
1980s Argentine films